Chorizandra is a genus of rhizomatous sedges, encompassing six species; four of which are endemic to Australia and two to New Caledonia.

Description 
The plants are rhizomatous perennials with terete and glabrous culms that are transversely septate and hollow between septa. The basal leaves basal are mostly reduced to sheaths with teret blades that are transversely septate. They produce a compact head-like inflorescence that is pseudolateral with many small spikelets surrounding a solid core. They later form brown obovoid to globose longitudinally ridged woody nuts.

Selected species 
Chorizandra australis K.L.Wilson
Chorizandra cymbaria R.Br.
Chorizandra enodis Nees
Chorizandra multiarticulata Nees	
Chorizandra sphaerocephala R.Br.

References

 
Cyperaceae genera
Taxa named by Robert Brown (botanist, born 1773)